The Wisconsin Hockey Hall of Fame which is located in Eagle River, Wisconsin, was founded in 1975 and is housed in the Eagle River Sports Arena. The hall was established to honor outstanding individuals responsible for the development, growth and success of amateur ice hockey in the State of Wisconsin.

The Hall is open daily from 9:00 am to 5:00 pm. During the season it opens and closes when the rink does which is usually before 9:00 am and after 5:00 pm.

Notable Inductees
 Jeff Sauer - 2004
 Craig Ludwig - 2002
 Mark Johnson - 2001
 Bob Suter - 2001
 John Mayasich - 1989
 Bob Johnson- 1987

See also
United States Hockey Hall of Fame
Wisconsin Athletic Walk of Fame

External links
Wisconsin Hockey Hall of Fame official website

Ice hockey in Wisconsin
Ice hockey museums and halls of fame
Halls of fame in Wisconsin
State sports halls of fame in the United States
Buildings and structures in Vilas County, Wisconsin
Awards established in 1975
Tourist attractions in Vilas County, Wisconsin
1975 establishments in Wisconsin